Massachusetts Senate's 1st Bristol and Plymouth district in the United States is one of 40 legislative districts of the Massachusetts Senate. It covers 26.9% of Bristol County and 3.2% of Plymouth County population. Democrat Michael Rodrigues of Westport has represented the district since 2011.

Locales represented
The district includes the following localities:
 Fall River
 Freetown
 Lakeville
 Rochester
 Somerset
 Swansea
 Westport

The current district geographic boundary overlaps with those of the Massachusetts House of Representatives' 4th Bristol, 5th Bristol, 6th Bristol, 7th Bristol, 8th Bristol, 10th Bristol, and 12th Bristol districts.

List of senators

See also
 List of Massachusetts Senate elections
 List of Massachusetts General Courts
 List of former districts of the Massachusetts Senate
 Bristol County districts of the Massachusetts House of Representatives: 1st, 2nd, 3rd, 4th, 5th, 6th, 7th, 8th, 9th, 10th, 11th, 12th, 13th, 14th
 Plymouth County districts of the Massachusetts House of Representatives: 1st, 2nd, 3rd, 4th, 5th, 6th, 7th, 8th, 9th, 10th, 11th, 12th

References

External links
  (State Senate district information based on U.S. Census Bureau's American Community Survey).

Senate 
Government of Bristol County, Massachusetts
Government of Plymouth County, Massachusetts
Massachusetts Senate